Anhée is a municipality of Wallonia located in the province of Namur, Belgium.

On 1 January 2006 the municipality had 6,934 inhabitants. The total area is 65.67 km2, giving a population density of 106 inhabitants per km2.

The municipality consists of the following districts: Anhée, Annevoie-Rouillon, Bioul, Denée, Haut-le-Wastia, Sosoye and Warnant.

The village of Bioul contains Vaxelaire Castle (Château Vaxelaire). Maredsous Abbey and Maredret Abbey are located near Denée.

See also
 List of protected heritage sites in Anhée

References

External links
 
Official website

 
Sub-municipalities of Anhée
Municipalities of Namur (province)